A Room with a View is a 1985 British romance film directed by James Ivory and produced by Ismail Merchant. It is written by Ruth Prawer Jhabvala, who adapted E. M. Forster's 1908 novel A Room with a View. Set in England and Italy, it is about a young woman named Lucy Honeychurch (Helena Bonham Carter) in the final throes of the restrictive and repressed culture of Edwardian England, and her developing love for a free-spirited young man, George Emerson (Julian Sands). Maggie Smith, Denholm Elliott, Daniel Day-Lewis, Judi Dench and Simon Callow feature in supporting roles. The film closely follows the novel by use of chapter titles to distinguish thematic segments.

A Room with a View received universal critical acclaim and was a box-office success. At the 59th Academy Awards, it was nominated for eight Academy Awards (including Best Picture) and won three: Best Adapted Screenplay, Best Art Direction, and Best Costume Design. It also won five British Academy Film Awards and a Golden Globe. In 1999, the British Film Institute placed A Room with a View 73rd on its list of the top 100 British films.

Plot
In 1907, a young Englishwoman, Lucy Honeychurch (Helena Bonham Carter), and her spinster cousin and chaperone, Charlotte Bartlett (Maggie Smith), stay at the Pensione Bertolini while on holiday in Florence. They are disappointed their rooms lack a view of the River Arno as promised. At dinner, they meet other English guests: the Reverend Mr Beebe (Simon Callow), two elderly spinster sisters, the Misses Alan (Fabia Drake and Joan Henley), romance author Eleanor Lavish (Judi Dench), and the freethinking Mr. Emerson (Denholm Elliott) and his quiet, handsome son, George (Julian Sands).

Learning about Charlotte and Lucy's view predicament, Mr. Emerson and George offer to exchange rooms, though Charlotte considers the suggestion indelicate. Mr Beebe mediates, and the switch is made. While touring the Piazza della Signoria the next day, Lucy witnesses a local man being brutally stabbed and killed. She faints but George Emerson appears and comes to her aid. When Lucy has recovered, the two have a brief, but unchaperoned discussion before returning to the pensione.

Later, Charlotte, Lucy, and the Emersons join other British tourists for a day trip to the Fiesole countryside. On the way, the carriage driver canoodles with his girlfriend sitting beside him, much to Charlotte Bartlett’s shock. The girlfriend is asked to get off the carriage in the middle of the countryside to avoid further canoodling. Wishing to engage in gossip unsuitable for Lucy, Charlotte Bartlett and Miss Lavish encourage her to go for a walk and Lucy goes looking for Mr. Beebe. Instead, the Italian driver, possibly in revenge for the episode with his girlfriend earlier, leads her to where George Emerson is admiring the view from a hillside. Seeing Lucy across a poppy field, he suddenly embraces and passionately kisses her. Charlotte appears and intervenes. Worried that Lucy's mother will consider her an inadequate chaperone, Charlotte swears Lucy to secrecy and cuts their trip short.

Upon returning to Surrey in England, Lucy says nothing to her mother about the incident and pretends to forget it. She is soon engaged to Cecil Vyse (Daniel Day-Lewis), a wealthy and socially prominent man who is cold, snobbish and pretentious. Cecil loves Lucy but he and his mother consider the Honeychurch family their social inferiors, which offends Mrs. Honeychurch. Lucy soon learns that Mr. Emerson is moving into Sir Harry Otway's rental cottage, with George visiting on weekends. Lucy intended for the two Misses Alan to live there and is cross with Cecil upon learning that through a chance meeting with the Emersons in London, Cecil recommended the cottage to them. He proclaims his motive was to annoy Sir Harry, who Cecil considers a snob; he assumes Harry will find the Emersons “too common."

George's presence upends Lucy's life, and her suppressed feelings for him surface. Meanwhile, Lucy's brother, Freddy (Rupert Graves), becomes friends with George. Freddy invites George to play tennis at Windy Corner, the Honeychurch home, during which Cecil mockingly reads aloud from Miss Lavish's latest novel set in Italy. Cecil, still reading, is oblivious when George passionately kisses Lucy in the garden. As Cecil continues reading aloud, Lucy recognizes a scene as being identical to her encounter with George in Fiesole. She confronts Charlotte, who admits to telling Miss Lavish about the kiss in the poppy field, who then used it in her story. Lucy orders George to leave Windy Corner and never return. He says that Cecil sees her only as a possession and will never love her for herself, as he would. Lucy seems unmoved, but soon after ends her engagement to Cecil, saying they are incompatible. To escape the ensuing fallout, she arranges to travel to Greece with the Misses Alan. George, unable to be around Lucy, arranges for his father to move to London, unaware Lucy is no longer engaged. When Lucy stops by Mr. Beebe's home to fetch Charlotte, she is confronted by Mr. Emerson, who happens to be there. She finally realizes and admits her true feelings for George. At the end, newlyweds George and Lucy honeymoon at the Italian pensione where they met, in the room with a view, overlooking Florence's Duomo.

Cast

Background

E. M. Forster began to write A Room with a View during a trip to Italy in the winter of 1901–02 when he was twenty-two. It was the first novel he worked on; however, he put it away before returning to it a few years later. Forster finished first two other novels: Where Angels Fear to Tread (1905) and then The Longest Journey (1907). A Room with a View was finally published in 1908. Set in Italy and England, A Room with a View follows Lucy Honeychurch, a proper young Englishwoman who discovers passion while on a trip to Italy. At her return to the restrained culture of Edwardian-era England, she must choose between two opposite men: the free-thinking George Emerson and the repressed aesthete Cecil Vyse. The story is both a romance and a humorous critique of English society at the beginning of the 20th century. The novel, Forster's third, was very well received, better than his previous two, but it is considered lighter than his two best-regarded later works Howards End (1910) and A Passage to India (1924). In Forster's own appreciation "A Room with a View, may not be his best, but may very well be his nicest".

Forster's early draft of the novel, entitled Lucy, has the triangle of Lucy, Miss Bartlett, and a shadowy George Emerson already in place, as well as the two Miss Alans and the novelist, Miss Lavish. In these first notes, the story begins in the Pensione Bertolini in Florence but breaks off before the return to England, and its various sketchy episodes bear little resemblance to the finished work. In 1903, Forster went on with his novel, and now Cecil Vyse makes his appearance, as well as old Mr. Emerson, Reverend Beebe, and Lucy's mother and brother Freddy. The action, commencing in Italy as before, is carried forward to England, but the plot was unresolved when Forster laid the novel away for the second time. In this version, the story ended with George riding his bicycle into a tree during a storm.
These early drafts have been published by Edward Arnold in The Lucy Novels (1977), edited by Oliver Stallybrass. In it, one may follow to some extent the development of the novel. He liked, too, the character of Lucy Honeychurch and, somewhat dyspeptically comparing her with the women in Howards End (1910), counting her as one of his few successes. The character of Lucy anticipates that of Adela Quested in A Passage To India, published in 1924. Both women seem to be fighting their own best natures, to be hysterically turning away from any kind of honest introspection, and at a crucial point in the story, to be embarking on an enterprise which will plunge them and everyone who loves them into misery.
The Lucy Novels also contain some bits that were used in the film, not in the published novel. The scene between Lucy and the guide in Santa Croce, for instance, with its mishmash of Italian and pidgin English, is from Forster's notebook. It is revealing, too, about the originals of some of the characters: George Emerson began as Forster's Cambridge friend, Hugh Meredith, Forster designating the character by the initials H.O.M. in his notes. As a type, Miss Lavish was based on Emily Spender, a writer Forster and his mother met in their travels, swinging about in a military cape and affecting thin cigars in the pensione smoking room.

In 1946, 20th Century Fox offered $25.000 for the film rights to A Room with a View, but Forster did not hold cinema in high regard and refused even though the studio was willing to pay him even more. Following Forster's death in 1970, the board of fellows of King's College at Cambridge inherited the rights to his books. However, Donald A Parry, chief executor, turned down all approaches. Ten years later, the film rights for Forster's novels became available when the film enthusiast Professor Bernard Williams became chief executor.
The trustees of Forster's estate invited producer Ismail Merchant and director James Ivory to Cambridge to discuss filming Forster. Merchant and Ivory surprised their hosts with their interest in A Room with a View, which the fellows of King's College considered "A little inconsequential early novel", rather than A Passage to India, which was generally considered to be the writer's best. Merchant and Ivory had no interest in A Passage to India because they had just finished a film featuring the British Raj: Heat and Dust was released in 1983.

For Merchant and Ivory, A Room with a View was their breakthrough to broader success.

Casting
The role of Lucy Honeychurch was Helena Bonham Carter's breakthrough as a film actress. She was nineteen at the time and had just finished the art-house film Lady Jane (1986). Ivory gave her the role as he found "she was very quick, very smart, and very beautiful". She fit Forster's description of Lucy as "a young lady with a quantity of dark hair and a very pretty, pale, undeveloped face" .

Rupert Everett auditioned for the role of Cecil Vyse. He would rather have played George Emerson, but Ivory thought that he was not quite right for it. It was Julian Sands who was cast as the male lead. Sands had gained notice as the British photographer in The Killing Fields (1984).

Daniel Day-Lewis came to the attention of Ivory though his role in the play Another Country as the gay student Guy Bennet. Given the choice of either George Emerson or Cecil Vyse, he took on the more challenging role of Cecil. 
The role of Freddy Honeychurch, Lucy's brother, went to Rupert Graves, in his film debut. He had had a minor role as one of the schoolboys in the play Another Country. 
Simon Callow had been Ivory's original choice for the character of Harry Hamilton-Paul, the friend of the Nawab, in the Merchant Ivory film Heat and Dust, but had committed to a play in London's West End. He had created the role of Mozart in the original London stage production of Peter Shaffer's play Amadeus (1979) and made his film debut in a small role in the film adaptation. In A Room with a View, he was cast as the vicar Mr. Beebe.

The supporting cast included veteran performers: Five years earlier, Maggie Smith had worked in another Merchant Ivory film, Quartet. With a prominent theater career, Judi Dench had made her film debut in 1964, but she took the supporting role of Eleanor Lavish. Dench and Ivory had disagreements during the filming of A Room with a View because, among other things, he suggested that she play her character as a Scot.

Filming
The film was made on a budget of $3 million that included investment by Cinecom in the U.S, and from Goldcrest Films, The National Finance Corporation, and Curzon Film Distributors in Great Britain.

A Room with a View was shot extensively on location in Florence, where Merchant Ivory had the Piazza della Signoria cleared for filming. Villa di Maiano in Fiesole served as the Pensione Bertolini. From its decoration of the walls they asked a painter to do a series of decorative artworks called grotesques that were used for titles between sections of the film, like chapter headings, following chapter titles in Forster's novel.

Other scenes were filmed in London and around the town of Sevenoaks in Kent where they borrowed the Kent family estate of film critic John Pym for their country scenes. Lucy's engagement party was filmed in the grounds of Emmetts Garden. Foxwold House near Chiddingstone was used for the Honeychurch house and an artificial pond was built in the forest of the property to use as the Sacred Lake. Two years later, the Great Storm of 1987 would tear through the area and destroy the gardens and almost 80 acres of the surrounding forest. In London, the Linley Sambourne House in South Kensington was used for Cecil's house and the Estonian Legation on Queensway was used for the boarding house where the Miss Alans live. In all, A Room with a View was shot in ten weeks: four in Italy and six in England. The film includes a notable scene of full frontal male nudity in which George, Freddy, and Mr Beebe go skinnydipping in a pond.

Reception

Critical reception
The film received positive reviews from critics, holding a 100% rating on Rotten Tomatoes based on 32 reviews, with a weighted average of 8.40/10. The site's consensus reads: "The hard edges of E.M Forster novel may be sanded off, but what we get with A Room with a View is an eminently entertaining comedy with an intellectual approach to love". According to Metacritic, which sampled the opinions of 21 critics and calculated a score of 83 out of 100, the film received "universal acclaim". Roger Ebert gave the film four out of four stars, writing: "It is an intellectual film, but intellectual about emotions: It encourages us to think about how we feel, instead of simply acting on our feelings."

A Room With a View appeared on 61 critics' ten-best lists in 1986, making it one of the most acclaimed films of the year.  Only Hannah and Her Sisters appeared on more lists.

Box office
The film made $4.4 million at the US box office in the first 12 weeks of release.

Goldcrest Films invested £460,000 in the film and earned £1,901,000 meaning they made a profit of £1,441,000.

Awards and nominations

Soundtrack
 "O mio babbino caro" (from Gianni Schicchi by Puccini) – Kiri Te Kanawa with the LPO, conducted by Sir John Pritchard
 "The Pensione Bertollini"
 "Lucy, Charlotte, and Miss Lavish See the City"
 "In the Piazza Signoria"
 "The Embankment"
 "Phaeton and Persephone"
 "Chi il bel sogno di Doretta" (from La Rondine, Act One by Puccini) – Te Kanawa with the LPO, conducted by Pritchard
 "The Storm"
 "Home, and the Betrothal"
 "The Sacred Lake"
 "The Allan Sisters"
 "In the National Gallery"
 "Windy Corner"
 "Habanera" (from Carmen by Georges Bizet)
 "The Broken Engagement"
 "Return to Florence"
 "End Titles"

 Original music composed by Richard Robbins
 Soundtrack album produced by Simon Heyworth
 Arrangements by Frances Shaw and Barrie Guard
 Music published by Filmtrax PLC

See also
 Baedeker, a travel guide mentioned several times in the film
 Chiddingstone Castle, used as a filming location
 BFI Top 100 British films

References

Sources
 Ingersoll, Earl G. Filming Forster: The Challenges of Adapting E.M. Forster's Novels for the Screen. Fairleigh Dickinson University Press. 2012, 
 Long, Robert Emmet. The Films of Merchant Ivory. Citadel Press. 1993, 
 Long, Robert Emmet. James Ivory in Conversation. University of California Press, 2005, .

External links
 A Room with a View on the Merchant Ivory Productions website
 
 
 
 
 
 
 A Room with a View: English Hearts and Italian Sunshine an essay by John Pym at the Criterion Collection

1985 films
1985 independent films
1985 romantic drama films
Best Film BAFTA Award winners
British independent films
British romantic drama films
E. M. Forster in performing arts
Film4 Productions films
Films based on British novels
Films directed by James Ivory
Films featuring a Best Supporting Actress Golden Globe-winning performance
Films set in country houses
Films set in England
Films set in Florence
Films set in hotels
Films set in Italy
Films set in the 1900s
Films shot in England
Films shot in Kent
Films shot in Florence
Films shot in Tuscany
Films that won the Best Costume Design Academy Award
Films whose art director won the Best Art Direction Academy Award
Films whose writer won the Best Adapted Screenplay Academy Award
Goldcrest Films films
Independent Spirit Award for Best Foreign Film winners
Merchant Ivory Productions films
British historical romance films
Romantic period films
Films with screenplays by Ruth Prawer Jhabvala
Films about interclass romance
1980s English-language films
1980s British films